Parliamentary elections were held in Slovakia on 14 August 1946, when the Slovak Commissariat of Interior assigned seats in the National Council to the political parties according to their result in the 1946 state parliament election. They were the last elections before the Communist takeover in 1948. Vast majority of 100 seats went to the conservative Democratic Party. The elections also determined the composition of the Slovak Board of Commissioners.

Result

References

Slovakia
Parliamentary elections in Slovakia
Legislative elections in Czechoslovakia
Slovakia